Rosheuvel is a surname, likely of Dutch origin. Notable people with the surname include:

Darren Rosheuvel (born 1994), Dutch professional footballer
Golda Rosheuvel (born 1970), Guyanese-British actress and singer
Mikhail Rosheuvel (born 1990), Dutch professional footballer